The 2019–20 American Eagles men's basketball team represented American University during the 2019–20 NCAA Division I men's basketball season. The Eagles, led by seventh-year head coach Mike Brennan, play their home games at Bender Arena in Washington, D.C. as members of the Patriot League. They finished the season 16–14, 12–6 in Patriot League play to finish in a tie for second place. They lost in the quarterfinals of the Patriot League tournament to Bucknell.

Previous season 
The Eagles finished the 2018–19 season 15–15, 9–9 in Patriot League play to finish in fourth place. They lost in the quarterfinals of the Patriot League tournament to Navy.

Roster

Schedule and results

|-
!colspan=9 style=| Non-conference regular season

|-
!colspan=9 style=| Patriot League regular season

|-
!colspan=9 style=| Patriot League tournament

Source

References

American Eagles men's basketball seasons
American
American Eagles men's basketball
American Eagles men's basketball